The Way Back is a 2010 American survival film directed by Peter Weir, from a screenplay by Weir and Keith Clarke. The film is inspired by The Long Walk (1956), the memoir by former Polish prisoner of war Sławomir Rawicz, who claimed to have escaped from a Soviet Gulag and walked  to freedom in World War II. The film stars Jim Sturgess, Colin Farrell, Ed Harris, and Saoirse Ronan, with Alexandru Potocean, Sebastian Urzendowsky, Gustaf Skarsgård, Dragoș Bucur and Mark Strong.

The film was nominated for an Oscar for Best Makeup, but lost to The Wolfman. The nomination was received by Gregory Funk, Edouard F. Henriques and Yolanda Toussieng.

Plot
During World War II, after the Soviet invasion of Poland, young Polish army officer Janusz Wieszczek is held as a prisoner and interrogated by the NKVD. The Soviets, unable to get him to admit that he is a spy, take his wife into custody as well and severely torture her; from her they extort a statement condemning him. He is sentenced to 20 years in a Gulag labour camp deep in Siberia.

There he meets those with whom he later plans an escape: Mr. Smith, an American engineer; Khabarov, an actor; Valka, a hardened Russian criminal; Tomasz, a Polish artist; Voss, a Latvian priest; Kazik, a Pole suffering from night blindness; and Zoran, a Yugoslav accountant. Khabarov secretly tells Janusz that he is planning to escape south to Mongolia, passing Lake Baikal. Smith cautions Janusz that it is Khabarov's way to discuss escape plans with newcomers, to maintain his morale, but nothing will come of it. At times Janusz seems to hallucinate the front door of a country home and adjoining window ledge, which holds plants and a rock he attempts to reach for. Janusz follows through with the escape with Smith, Valka, Voss, Tomasz, Zoran and Kazik during a severe snowstorm that covers their tracks.

Kazik freezes to death the second night of the trek, after losing his way back to the campsite while looking for wood, and the group buries him. After many days of travelling across the snows of Siberia, the group reaches Lake Baikal. There they meet Irena, a young Polish girl, who tells them that Russian soldiers murdered her parents and sent her to a collective farm near Warsaw, where they treated her cruelly, so she escaped. Smith realises the inaccuracies in her story, as Warsaw is occupied by the Germans; nevertheless, despite his misgivings that she'll slow them down and tax their meager food supply, he agrees with the group to let her in. Smith eventually cautions her about the lie and says he will not tolerate any more, in response to which she admits that her parents were communists but the communist rulers killed them anyway and sent her to an orphanage.

When the group reaches an unpatrolled border between the Soviet Union and Mongolia, Valka, who idolizes Joseph Stalin and does not know what he would do elsewhere, decides to stay. The rest continue to Ulaanbaatar, but soon they see images of Stalin, Khorloogiin Choibalsan and a red star. Janusz realises that Mongolia is under communist control and since China is at war with Japan, tells the group they should take refuge in British India. As they continue south across the Gobi Desert, lack of water, sandstorms, sunburn, blisters and sunstroke weaken the group. They find a well, which provides temporary relief. However, shortly after departing, they are hit by a sandstorm and lose the majority of their water supply. Realizing they could never find the well again, the group carries on. Irena collapses several times and soon dies. A few days later Tomasz collapses and dies. Smith is on the verge of death, but after being motivated by Janusz, Zoran and Voss, decides to rejoin the group and the severely dehydrated four find a much-needed water source. Soon after, they reach China by passing through the Great Wall.

As they reach the Himalayas, all of them on the verge of death, they are rescued by a Tibetan monk who takes them to a Buddhist monastery where they regain their strength. Smith decides to go to Lhasa with the help of one of the monk's contacts, who will smuggle him out through China. Once there, he anticipates he will be able to connect with the US military, his return to America ensured. The remaining three continue to trek through the Himalayas and soon reach India and get assistance from villagers. The Indian government helps them reach their home peacefully.

At the end of the film, Janusz keeps walking around the world until 1989, when the communist regime in Poland is ousted from power. The final scene of the film shows Janusz, 50 years after being taken captive, again envisioning the door and reaching for the rock; this time he takes a key hidden beneath the rock to open the door and reconcile with his wife.

Cast
 Jim Sturgess as Janusz Wieszczek, a young Polish inmate made a prisoner of war during the Soviet invasion of Poland
 Ed Harris as Mr. Smith, an American inmate and former engineer
 Saoirse Ronan as Irena Zielińska, an orphaned teenage Polish girl trying to escape from the Soviet Union, who meets up with the fugitives near Lake Baikal
 Colin Farrell as Valka, a tough Russian inmate and gambler whose most prized possession is a knife he calls "Wolf"
 Dragoș Bucur as Zoran, a Yugoslavian inmate who used to be an accountant and is considered a funny man
 Alexandru Potocean as Tomasz Horodinsky, a Polish inmate and former pastry chef who dreams of becoming an artist
 Gustaf Skarsgård as Andrejs Voss, a Latvian inmate and former priest
 Sebastian Urzendowsky as Kazik, a young Polish inmate suffering from night blindness
 Mark Strong as Andrei Timofeyevich Khabarov, a Russian inmate and actor who was imprisoned when the play he was in was deemed subversive by Soviet authorities

Production

Background
The film is loosely based on The Long Walk (1956), Sławomir Rawicz's memoir depicting his alleged escape from a Siberian Gulag and subsequent 4,000-mile walk to freedom in India. The book sold over 500,000 copies and is credited with inspiring many explorers. In 2006 the BBC unearthed records (including some written by Rawicz himself) which showed that, rather than having escaped from the gulag, he had in fact been released by the USSR in 1942. Nevertheless, there is some circumstantial evidence that some sort of trek to freedom occurred, via the route outlined in the book and film.  Captain Rupert Mayne, a British intelligence officer in Calcutta in 1942, interviewed three emaciated men, who claimed to have escaped from Siberia. Mayne always believed their story was the same as that of The Long Walk. So the possibility remains that someone – even if not Rawicz – achieved this extraordinary feat. Though the director Peter Weir continues to claim that the so-called long walk happened, he himself now describes The Way Back as "essentially a fictional film".

Laurence Harvey and Herbert Wilcox announced plans to make a film from The Long Walk in 1957.

Filming
Principal photography took place in Bulgaria, Morocco and India.

Reception
The Way Back received generally positive reviews. Review aggregator Rotten Tomatoes reports a 74% approval rating based on 139 reviews, with an average rating of 6.88/10. The critics consensus is: "It isn't as emotionally involving as it should be, but this Peter Weir epic offers sweeping ambition and strong performances to go with its grand visual spectacle." On Metacritic, the film has a weighted average score of 66 out of 100 based on 33 critics, indicating "generally favorable reviews". Empire awarded the film three out of five stars and wrote, "It's good, but from this director we have come to expect great." The Guardian awarded it three out of five and wrote, "Weir has put together a good film – oddly, though, considering its scale, it feels like a rather small one." The Telegraph called the film "A journey that feels awful and heroic and unfathomable – and one you’ll want to watch again."

Music
The soundtrack to The Way Back was released on January 18, 2010.

See also
The Desperate Ones, 1967 film about a gulag escape by two Polish brothers
As Far as My Feet Will Carry Me, 2001 film about a German World War II prisoner of war escaping from a Siberian Gulag to the Iranian border
Gulag, 1985 film depicting a gulag escape and arduous journey to freedom

References

Further reading
 
 This is an excellent collection of articles relating to the movie The Way Back, the book upon which it was based The Long Walk, Linda Willis' Looking For Mr. Smith, and related materials.
  An interesting contemporary discussion of Rawicz's book by a noted explorer.

External links

 The Way Back walk path at Google Maps
 
 
 
 
 

2010 films
2010 war drama films
2010s survival films
American survival films
American war drama films
English-language Polish films
Films about death
Drama films based on actual events
American anti-communist propaganda films
Films about prison escapes
Films about the Soviet Union in the Stalin era
Films directed by Peter Weir
Films set in China
Films set in deserts
Films set in India
Films set in Mongolia
Films set in Poland
Films set in Russia
Films set in the 1930s
Films set in the 1940s
Films set in the 1980s
Films shot in Bulgaria
Films shot in India
Films shot in Morocco
Newmarket films
American World War II films
World War II films based on actual events
World War II prisoner of war films
2010 drama films
Works about the Gulag
Films about accountants
2010s English-language films
2010s American films
Films set in Siberia